Jay Withington Johnson (September 30, 1943October 17, 2009) was an American politician and journalist who served as the 36th director of the United States Mint, and one-term member of the United States House of Representatives from Wisconsin. He was also a television news anchor in Green Bay, Wisconsin for WFRV-TV and WLUK-TV.

Early life and education 
Johnson was born in Bessemer, Michigan and graduated from Bessemer High School. He earned an associate degree in speech from Gogebic Community College in 1963 and a Bachelor of Arts degree in speech from Northern Michigan University in 1965. Johnson was an information specialist with the United States Army from 1966 until 1968. He was on the board of directors of the Wisconsin United Way. Johnson received a master's degree in radio and television arts from Michigan State University in 1970.

Career

Journalism 
Johnson was a broadcaster and journalist working in Michigan, Indiana, and Florida before settling Green Bay, Wisconsin, where he worked for 16 years at WFRV-TV and WLUK-TV.

Politics 
In 1996, Johnson was elected to represent  in the 105th United States Congress after 18-year incumbent Toby Roth chose not to run for a 10th term. He was the fourth Democrat to represent the district in the 20th century. He was defeated after one term by State Assemblyman Mark Green in 1998. In August 1999, Johnson was nominated by President Bill Clinton to become Director of the United States Mint. He was confirmed by the United States Senate in May 2000 and served until his successor was appointed by President George W. Bush in August 2001. After leaving the U.S. Mint, he was self-employed, selling wholesale coins and was the chief numismatist for The Franklin Mint.

On June 29, 2009, Goldline International, Inc., announced that Johnson had become a spokesperson for their company.

Death 

On October 17, 2009, Johnson died at his home in Bristow, Virginia, of an apparent heart attack. He was survived by his wife, JoLee, and his two stepchildren.

Electoral history

| colspan="6" style="text-align:center;background-color: #e9e9e9;"| Democratic Primary Election, September 10, 1996

| colspan="6" style="text-align:center;background-color: #e9e9e9;"| General Election, November 5, 1996

| colspan="6" style="text-align:center;background-color: #e9e9e9;"| General Election, November 3, 1998

References

External links
 
 
 
 2009 Wisconsin Assembly Joint Resolution 88
 

1943 births
2009 deaths
People from Bessemer, Michigan
People from Prince William County, Virginia
American television news anchors
Directors of the United States Mint
Michigan State University alumni
Northern Michigan University alumni
Gogebic Community College alumni
Military personnel from Wisconsin
United States Army soldiers
Democratic Party members of the United States House of Representatives from Wisconsin
20th-century American politicians
Clinton administration personnel
George W. Bush administration personnel